Paroxysmal cold hemoglobinuria (PCH) is an autoimmune hemolytic anemia featured by complement-mediated intravascular hemolysis after cold exposure. It can present as an acute non-recurrent postinfectious event in children, or chronic relapsing episodes in adults with hematological malignancies or tertiary syphilis. Described by Julius Donath (1870–1950) and Karl Landsteiner (1868–1943) in 1904, PCH is one of the first clinical entities recognized as an autoimmune disorder.

Signs and symptoms
Pediatric patients usually present with acute onset of hemolytic anemia with fatigue, exercise intolerance, pallor, jaundice, and hemoglobinuria, preceded by exposure to cold temperature and preceding viral-like illness. This may be complicated by acute renal failure due to nephrotoxic free hemoglobin and tubular obstruction. Although the disease may be fulminant during onset, the acute form generally follows a transient, self-limiting course. 

Chronic relapsing PCH manifests as episodic hemoglobinuria and anemic symptoms, usually milder than the acute form. While the classical syphilitic PCH becomes infrequent, paraneoplastic cause with underlying hematological malignancies especially in the elderly should be considered. Hepatosplenomegaly and adenomegaly are not pertinent to PCH, unless associated with underlying lymphoproliferative disorders. This form remains refractory if the underlying condition is not treated.

Cause
Infectious agents are implicated in the acute form of PCH. Viral agents include measles, mumps, Epstein-Barr virus, cytomegalovirus, varicella-zoster virus, influenza virus, and adenovirus. Non-viral agents include Mycoplasma pneumoniae and Haemophilus influenzae. Chronic relapsing PCH is classically associated with syphilis, as well as hematological malignancies including non-Hodgkin lymphoma and myeloproliferative neoplasms.

Pathophysiology 
The exact pathogenesis is not fully elucidated. The hallmark feature is the formation of polyclonal IgG autoantibody against the P antigen, which is a polysaccharide surface antigen on red cells in most humans. As a weak, biphasic antibody, it absorbs to the P antigen in the cold temperature as in the periphery in the primary phase, and fixes complement on recirculation to the core temperature in the secondary phase, resulting in intravascular hemolysis.

Diagnosis 
The purposes of laboratory investigations are to: 

 Confirm the presence of intravascular hemolysis in terms of metabolic products of red cells and hematopoietic response. 
 Establish the diagnosis of autoimmune hemolytic anemia and differentiate from other AIHA. 
 Identify other supporting features as in hematopathological findings.

For intravascular hemolysis, the laboratory parameters include increased serum free hemoglobin, lactate dehydrogenase, unconjugated bilirubin, and reduced haptoglobin. Urine tests may show elevated hemoglobinuria and hemosiderinuria in chronic cases. Reticulocytosis may not be apparent in the acute phase or when there is viral-induced myelosuppression.

Once the clinical suspicion of autoimmune hemolytic anemia is made, direct antiglobulin test (DAT) or direct Coombs' test is the first line of investigation to confirm the presence of warm autoantibodies. Testing with polyspecific and IgG-specific antiglobulin agents is usually negative, and that with C3-specific agent may be positive. On excluding warm autoimmune hemolytic anemia (WAIHA), the cold agglutinin titer should be examined for cold agglutinin disease (CAD). The diagnosis of PCH is suspected when both WAIHA and CAD are excluded. The complement level is usually low. 

Donath-Landsteiner test is the confirmatory test for PCH. It involves the cooling of the patient's serum to 4°C to allow the absorption of anti-P autoantibodies to the red cells, followed by warming to 37°C to activate complement fixation and hemolysis. Indirect DL test with addition of ABO-compatible P antigen-positive blood can be performed in case the direct DL test is negative, since the complement in the original serum may be consumed and result in false negative. 

The hematopathological findings can reflect both the presence of intravascular hemolysis and the underlying immunological process. The complete blood count usually shows normocytic anemia. Reticulocytosis may be subtle in the acute phase. Peripheral blood smear may show corresponding polychromasia. Neutrophil erythrophagocytosis is suggestive of PCH, while the absence of red cell agglutination as in CAD or microspherocytosis in WAIHA should also be noted.

Classification
AIHA can be classified as warm autoimmune hemolytic anemia  or cold autoimmune hemolytic anemia, which includes cold agglutinin disease and paroxysmal cold hemoglobinuria. These classifications are based on the characteristics of the autoantibodies involved in the pathogenesis of the disease. Each has a different underlying cause, management, and prognosis, making classification important when treating a patient with AIHA.

Autoimmune hemolytic anemia

Warm-antibody type
Primary
Secondary  (lymphoproliferative disorders, autoimmune disorders)
Cold-antibody type (anemia)
Primary cold agglutinin disease
Secondary cold agglutinin syndrome
Associated with malignant disease
Acute, transient, infection-associated  (acute cold antibody mediated AIHA complicating Mycoplasma pneumoniae or viral infections)
Chronic (lymphoproliferative disorders)
Paroxysmal cold hemoglobinuria
Idiopathic
Secondary
Acute, transient (Infections other than syphilis)
Chronic (syphilis)
Mixed cold- and warm-antibody type
Idiopathic
Secondary (lymphoproliferative disorders, autoimmune disorders)
Drug-induced immune hemolytic anemia
Autoimmune type
Drug absorption type
Neoantigen type

Management 
Acute PCH is usually transient and self-limiting. Supportive treatment includes rest, normothermia and transfusion when indicated. Intensive care for the development of acute kidney injury should be offered. Plasmapheresis is proposed to be an adjunctive measure to facilitate recovery. Steroids and other immunosuppressants are sometimes administered and the beneficial effect is uncertain. Immunotherapy is considered in refractory to corticosteroids and immunosuppression. Monoclonal antibodies e.g. rituximab (anti-CD20) and eculizumab (anti-C5) have been used but the therapeutic benefits are controversial. Antibiotic therapy should be given if syphilitic cause is confirmed, while investigations and management for hematological malignancies should be pursued in adult patients with unexplained PCH.

Epidemiology 
Estimated incidence of PCH is 0.4 per 100000 population, and the prevalence ranges from 1.6% to 40% in patients with autoimmune hemolytic anemia. The prevalence depends on the sensitivity of the immunologic methods applied. The age of onset is often <5 years in the pediatric population, with male predominance ranging from 2.5:1 to 5:1 in male-to-female ratio. 

The majority of PCH were accounted by congenital or tertiary syphilis in the early 1900s. Since the application of antibiotic therapy and prenatal screening, syphilitic PCH has become a rare entity. It is now increasingly recognized in pediatric patients with preceding viral-like illness.

See also
 Cold agglutinin disease
 Cold sensitive antibody
 Hemolytic anemia
 List of hematologic conditions

References

External links 

Acquired hemolytic anemia